"So Rare" is a popular song published in 1937 by composer Jerry Herst and lyricist Jack Sharpe. It became a hit for Jimmy Dorsey in 1957.

The version by Carl Ravell and his Orchestra, from a session on 4 June 1937, was the earliest recording of the song, although it is unclear whether it was the first released version.  The earliest popular versions of "So Rare" were the 1937 releases by Guy Lombardo and his Royal Canadians and by Gus Arnheim and his Coconut Grove Orchestra.

Before it had been recorded or even published, Fred Astaire had sung "So Rare" on his radio show The Packard Hour. This was the recollection of Jess Oppenheimer, then a writer for the show, who recommended the song on behalf of his friend Jerry Herst, then an "aspiring songwriter". According to Oppenheimer, this led to "So Rare" being "snapped up by a publisher who heard it on the program".

Since 1937, "So Rare" has been recorded by numerous artists, but it notably became a late-career hit in 1957 for Jimmy Dorsey, reaching #2 on Billboard magazine's pop charts, and #4 on the R&B singles chart.  Recorded on 11 November 1956 and released on the Cincinnati label Fraternity, Jimmy Dorsey's version, which had a decidedly rhythm and blues feel unlike the earlier versions, became the highest-charting song by a big band during the first decade of the rock and roll era. Credited on the label to "Jimmy Dorsey with Orchestra and Chorus", the vocals are by the Artie Malvin Singers. Billboard ranked this version as the No. 5 song for 1957.

Less than two months after "So Rare" became a hit, Jimmy Dorsey died from lung cancer.

Recorded versions
  
Carl Ravell and his Orchestra (1937)	
Henry King & His Orchestra (1937)
Gus Arnheim and his Coconut Grove Orchestra (1937)
Jimmy Ray & the Southern Serenaders (1937)
Guy Lombardo and his Royal Canadians (1937)
Carroll Gibbons And The Savoy Hotel Orpheans (1937)
Josephine Bradley and her Ballroom Orchestra (1937)
Edgar Hayes Quintet (1942)
Vera Lynn (1952)
Marian McPartland and George Shearing (1953)
Toots Thielmans (c.1955)
Bing Crosby (1957) 
Jimmy Dorsey (1957)
The Kirchin Band & The Bandits (1957)
Frank Chacksfield & his Orchestra (1958)
Don Cherry (1958)
Jimmy Carroll Orchestra (195?)
Andy Williams (1959)
Dick Richards & his Orchestra (1959)
Bobby Byrne And The Alumni Orchestra (1959)
Ella Fitzgerald (1960)
Mavis Rivers (1960)
Esquivel y su Orquesta (1960)
Mose Allison (1961)
King Curtis (1961)
Bill Black (1962)
Chet Atkins (1964)
Ray Conniff (1965)
The Mills Brothers (1967)
The Voices of East Harlem (1974)
Joe Pass and Jimmy Rowles (1981)
Beegie Adair (2009)

See also
Billboard year-end top 50 singles of 1957
List of CHUM number-one singles of 1957

Notes and references

External links
 Lead sheet for "So Rare" at Wikifonia
 Review of The Fabulous Jimmy Dorsey (1957) at AllMusic.com, Dorsey's final album with four tracks from the "So Rare" sessions

1937 songs
1957 singles
Fraternity Records singles
Jimmy Dorsey songs
Andy Williams songs
Bing Crosby songs
Guy Lombardo songs